Manila rope is a type of rope made from manila hemp.  

Manila hemp is a type of fiber obtained from the leaves of the abacá.  It is not actually hemp, but named so because hemp was long a major source of fiber, and other fibers were sometimes named after it. The name refers to the capital of the Philippines, one of the main producers of abacá.

Applications and properties 
Manila rope is very durable, flexible, and resistant to salt water damage, allowing its use in rope, hawsers, ships' lines, and fishing nets. It can be used to make handcrafts like bags, carpets, clothing, furniture, and hangings.

Manila ropes shrink when they become wet.  This effect can be advantageous under certain circumstances, but if it is not a wanted feature, it should be well taken into account.  Since shrinkage is more pronounced the first time the rope becomes wet, new rope is usually immersed into water and put to dry before use so that the shrinkage is less than it would be if the rope had never been wet.  A major disadvantage in this shrinkage is that many knots made with manila rope became harder and more difficult to untie when wet, thus becoming subject of increased stress. Manila rope will rot after a period of time when exposed to saltwater.

Manila hemp rope was previously the favoured variety of rope used for executions by hanging, both in the U.K. and USA. Usually 3/4 to 1 inch diameter, boiled prior to use to take out any overelasticity.  It was also used in the 19th century as whaling line.

See also
 Fiber rope

References

Ropework